Schall can refer to;

People
Alvin Anthony Schall, American federal judge
Claus Schall (1757-1835), Danish violinist and composer 
Eduardo Schall Jatyr, Brazilian basketball player 
Ekkehard Schall (1930-2005), German stage and screen actor/director
Elizabeth Schall, American rock singer 
Elke Schall, German table tennis player
Franz Schall (1918-1945), German World War II fighter ace 
Gene Schall, American baseball player 
James V. Schall, American Jesuit priest 
Johann Adam Schall von Bell (1591-1666), German Jesuit missionary 
Johanna Schall, German actress 
Karl Friedrich Schall (1859-1925), German precision engineer
Kerry Schall, American mixed martial arts fighter 
Margrethe Schall (1775-1852), Danish ballerina 
Peder Schall (1762-1820), Danish composer 
Philipp Schall von Bell (?-1560), German commander-in-chief
Thomas D. Schall (1878-1935), American lawyer and politician

Other
Synodontis schall, a catfish species 
Schall Circle, a census-designated place in Palm Beach County, Florida